The Subway Series is a series of Major League Baseball (MLB) rivalry games played between the two teams based in New York City, the Yankees and the Mets. Previously, this applied to the Giants and Dodgers as well, before they moved out of New York City. Every historic and current venue for such games has been accessible via the New York City Subway, hence the name of the series.

The term's historic usage has been in reference to World Series games played between the city's teams. The New York Yankees have appeared in all Subway Series games as they have been the only American League (AL) team based in the city, and have compiled an 11–3 all-time series record in the 14 championship Subway Series.

Since 1997, the term Subway Series has been applied to interleague play during the regular season between the Yankees and New York City's National League (NL) team: the New York Mets. The Mets and Yankees also played each other in the 2000 World Series, in which the Yankees won.

19th century Trolley Series

Although organized games between all-stars from New York teams against all-stars from Brooklyn teams date back to the 1850s, the first actual New York-Brooklyn "World Championship Series" occurred in 1889, a full nine years before Brooklyn was incorporated into the City of New York by the Greater New York Act of 1898, when the New York Giants squared off against (and defeated) the Brooklyn Bridegrooms, also called the "Trolley Dodgers", of the American Association. The following season, Brooklyn withdrew from the Association and joined the League, setting the stage for many future intra-city competitions.

Some might argue that the 1889 Series would qualify as a "Trolley Series", but would not qualify as a Subway Series since New York's subway did not open until 1904.

The 1906 World Series between the Chicago Cubs and the Chicago White Sox is also loosely referred to as a Subway Series, though the term Crosstown Series is more commonly used. The term is also inaccurate, since Chicago had surface systems from 1892 till the building of the State Street Subway in 1943.

Early and mid-20th century Subway Series
By the 1920s, the subway had become an important form of public transport in the city and provided a convenient form of travel between the three city ballparks: the Polo Grounds, in upper Manhattan; Yankee Stadium, in the Bronx; and Ebbets Field in Brooklyn. The 155th Street elevated and subway stations, the 161st Street station, and the Prospect Park respectively, served the ballparks. (New York's subway and elevated systems—the IRT, BRT/BMT, and IND—were in competition with each other until 1940.)

In the case of the World Series contests listed, the entire Series could be attended by using the subway. The date of the first usage of the term "Subway Series" is uncertain. The term "Nickel Series" (a nickel was the old subway fare) appeared in newspapers by 1927, and "Subway Series" appeared by 1928. "Subway Series" was clearly already a familiar concept by 1934, as discussed in this article about that year's All-Star Game to be held in New York, discussing the "subway series" possibility for the Giants and Yankees. (Ultimately, no New York team made it to the 1934 post-season.).

Yankees–Giants

The 1921 and 1922 match-ups were played in a single ballpark, as both the Giants and Yankees then played at the Polo Grounds. The Giants won both of these World Series against the Yankees, the first two Subway Series played. Despite cordial relations just a few years before when the Yankees allowed the Giants to share their home at Hilltop Park for a year in 1911 and the Giants more than returning the favor in kind by sharing Polo Grounds with the Yankees since 1913, the Yankees were issued an eviction notice in mid-1920 ending their lease after the 1922 season. The Yankees opened their new ballpark in 1923. Fortunes changed immediately for the Yankees as they defeated the Giants this time in the third straight year of World Series competition between the two teams. Their new home would host the Yankees' first of 11 Subway World Series victories that year and first of an unprecedented 26 World Series until the stadium closed in 2008.

The venues for the 1923, 1936, 1937, and 1951 World Series—the Polo Grounds and the old Yankee Stadium—were a short walk apart across the Macombs Dam Bridge over the Harlem River.

Yankees–Dodgers

The term was used again in 1941 when the Dodgers made their first World Series appearance since 1920. Multiple Hall of Famers took part in these contests between the "Bronx Bombers" and "Dem Bums from Brooklyn" and the games involved numerous achievements including Jackie Robinson breaking the color barrier as the first African-American baseball player in the World Series and Don Larsen's performance in pitching the only perfect game in post-season history. The seven matchups between the Yankees and the Dodgers between 1941 and 1956 cemented the term as being mostly associated with the New York vs. Brooklyn contests, during the time when New York City was retroactively dubbed by historians as "The Capital of Baseball". Despite Brooklyn's repeated success at winning the National League pennant, it was only able to win one World Series (1955) against the Yankees.

World Series matchups
The all-New York match-ups in World Series play during this period been the following:

Exhibition series
In addition to the five World Series played between the Yankees and Giants before 1940, the two teams also played exhibition series against each other from time to time. The match-ups were known as the "City Series" and were sometimes played in October while other teams played in the World Series.  However, after 1940, this became difficult because the Yankees would routinely appear in the World Series. In the 17 years from 1941 to 1957 (after which the Giants and Dodgers left New York City for California), the Yankees appeared in the World Series 12 times, failing to reach the Series only in 1944, 1945, 1946, 1948, and 1954.

Before New York's two National League teams left the city, the Yankees and Dodgers played an annual midseason exhibition game called the Mayor's Trophy Game to benefit sandlot baseball in New York City. The proceeds raised by the Yankees were given to leagues in Manhattan and the Bronx, while proceeds raised by the Dodgers went to leagues on Long Island and Staten Island.  The annual charity event was discontinued following the 1957 season, when the Dodgers moved to Los Angeles and the Giants moved to San Francisco. leaving the Yankees as the only major league team in the city. The game was revived in 1963, after the National League returned to New York with the expansion New York Mets in 1962.  After dwindling interest and public bickering between the owners of both teams, the Mayor's Trophy Game was discontinued following the 1983 season. It was revived again as a pre-Opening Day series titled the "Mayor's Challenge" and held in 1989.

Modern usage

In modern usage, the term "Subway Series" generally refers to a series played between the two current New York baseball teams, the New York Yankees and the New York Mets. Their stadiums remain directly accessible by subway: Yankee Stadium via the 161st Street–Yankee Stadium station, and Citi Field via the Mets–Willets Point station. 

It can also refer to any time two New York City-based teams play each other, such as the Knicks and Nets in the NBA, and the Rangers and Islanders in the NHL. All of these teams' venues are easily accessible via the city's public transport as well: the Knicks and Rangers via 34th Street–Penn Station, the Nets via Atlantic Avenue–Barclays Center, and the Islanders via Elmont-UBS Arena and Belmont Park on the Long Island Railroad.

With the departure of the Dodgers and Giants in the 1950s New York was left without a crosstown rivalry. Even with the Mets joining MLB they were placed in the National League opposite of the Yankees. When interleague play was introduced in 1997 the teams finally got to play one another in a competitive fashion. The rivalry has included heated moments such as the Roger Clemens and Mike Piazza feud. Currently the Yankees lead the "Subway Series" 71–55 all time.

Mets–Yankees 
The Mets and Yankees first met in a regular season game on June 16, 1997, with the introduction of interleague play. The Mets  won the game 6-0. The Yankees took the next two games to win the series, all three being played at Yankee Stadium. 1999 marked the first year of this rendition of the Subway Series to be two three game series, three hosted by the Mets and three hosted by the Yankees. The Mets won the series for the first time in 2004, four games to two. The Yankees lead the series all time with 11 series wins to the Mets 3 series wins with there being 10 ties. The Yankees lead in head-to-head wins 75-52, counting postseason. 

The first two series in the rivalry were only one three game series hosted by one team, alternating each year. From 1999 to 2012 the series was changed to two three game series, with each team hosting three games. This format changed in 2013 to a two series of two games hosted by each team, except in years that the AL East and NL east play each year when it goes back to a three game series. 

The Mets and Yankees have played each other in games that live on as classics. The Yankees beat the Mets in the 2000 World Series 4 games to 1. This series included the infamous Mike Piazza and Roger Clemens incident. Clemens, of the Yankees, threw part of a broken bat at Piazza, of the Mets, after a hit. On June 12, 2009 Luis Castillo of the Mets dropped a popup hit by Alex Rodriguez giving the Yankees a win in the series. On May 19, 2006 David Wright, the Mets' third baseman, had a walk off hit off of Yankees' star reliever Mariano Rivera to cap off a Mets comeback.

2000 World Series

The name "Subway Series" was commonly applied to the 2000 World Series between the New York Yankees and the New York Mets. The Yankees won four games to one and celebrated their 26th championship in front of Mets fans at Shea Stadium. This was the only time that visiting teams had ever won a World Series at Shea Stadium.

During the 2000 World Series, the city decorated some of the trains that ran on the  train (which went to Shea Stadium in Queens, home of the Mets) and  train (which went to the old Yankee Stadium in the Bronx, home of the Yankees). The 7 trains were blue and orange and featured the Mets version of the "NY" logo, and the 4 trains were white with blue pinstripes and featured the Yankees version of the "NY" logo. Also, after each game in the series the city offered free subway rides home for attendees of the game.  Yankee fans displayed signs that read "Yankees in 4 and not in 7", predicting that the Yankees would easily dispatch the Mets in a Series sweep as opposed to a difficult, full-length Series.  The signs had the 4 in a dark green circle designating the number 4 train, and the 7 in a purple circle designating the number 7 train.

See also
 Mets–Yankees rivalry
 Knicks–Nets rivalry
 Islanders–Rangers rivalry
 Devils–Rangers rivalry
 Giants–Jets rivalry
 Hudson River Derby
 Dodgers-Giants rivalry

Notes
  The 1907, 1912, and 1922 World Series each included one tied game.
  The 1903, 1919, 1920, and 1921 World Series were in a best-of-nine format (carried by the first team to win five games).

References

External links
 2000 Subway Series Recap on MLB.com 
 Great Subway Series moments
 History of the Subway Series from the NY Times
 The Subway Series (and Other Inter-Urban Series)
 Subway Series Yankees vs. Mets history and boxscores from Newsday
 WHEN NEW YORK WAS ONE: The Yankees, the Mets & the 2000 Subway Series

Baseball in New York City
Brooklyn Dodgers
 
New York Yankees
New York Giants (NL)
New York Mets
Major League Baseball rivalries
Interleague play
Sports in the New York metropolitan area
1921 establishments in New York City